The D8 state road is the Croatian section of the Adriatic Highway, running from the Slovenian border at Pasjak via Rijeka, Senj, Zadar, Šibenik, Split, Opuzen and Dubrovnik to the border with Montenegro at Karasovići. Most of the D8 state road remains single carriageway, though with some dual carriageway stretches.

Until recently, the road was the primary route connecting the Adriatic coastal parts of Croatia. Since the 2000s, multilane motorways have taken over most of its traffic, and yet more motorways are still being built along the coast. The motorways parallel to the road are the A7 (Rupa border crossing – Rijeka – Sveti Kuzam), A6 (Rijeka – Bosiljevo) and A1 (Zagreb – Bosiljevo – Zadar – Split – Ploče), sections of the proposed Adriatic–Ionian motorway. Since the D8 closely follows the well-indented Croatian coastline, travel is considerably longer and less safe compared to the motorways because of numerous blind curves and at-grade intersections. The D8 is still popular as an alternative to the tolled motorways, so the road carries fairly constant traffic during most of the year. The traffic intensifies in the summer, because of substantial traffic to tourist destinations.

The section from Rijeka to Senj experiences heavy traffic in particular because many motorists are unwilling to take the longer route along A6 and A1. This problem used to be exacerbated before 2009 when A6 still had slow semi-highway parts on the Rijeka–Bosiljevo route. This section will remain congested at peak times until eventual completion of the A7 motorway between Rupa and Žuta Lokva.

Since the parallel A1 motorway ends near Ploče, southbound A1 traffic generally switches to the D8 state road.  after Ploče, the D8 road terminates at the Klek border crossing to Bosnia and Herzegovina, as the Adriatic Highway route runs across a tiny strip of Bosnia and Herzegovina territory around the town of Neum. As the route reenters Croatia at Zaton Doli border crossing the D8 state road resumes, running to Dubrovnik along the coastline. East of Dubrovnik the road passes by Dubrovnik Airport and reaches the border with Montenegro at the Karasovići border crossing.

There are official plans to build an expressway bypassing Neum in Bosnia and Herzegovina entirely via a series of tunnels and bridges, Pelješac Bridge being the most notable. The route would diverge from the current D8 route south of Ploče, cross the bridge to the Pelješac peninsula, form a junction to the D414 state road and rejoin the present D8 route near Doli. The expressway is to be tolled. So far no official road number has been assigned to the planned route, although construction of the Pelješac Bridge was started. It is also possible that the D8 designation will be transferred from the bypassed D8 section to the expressway.

The road, as well as all other state roads in Croatia, is managed and maintained by Hrvatske ceste, a state-owned company.

Traffic volume 

Traffic is regularly counted and reported by Hrvatske Ceste. Significant variations between annual (AADT) and summer (ASDT) traffic volumes are attributed to the fact that the road carries substantial tourist traffic.

Traffic volume on the D8 state road varies greatly, as the road runs through areas of more or less developed tourist industry. Furthermore, the road runs through or near a number of major Croatian cities, such as Rijeka, Zadar and Split, which add to the traffic volume significantly. Thus, the most congested section of the D8 state road is in the city of Split, between Solin and Stobreč, where the greatest AADT figures are regularly recorded, far exceeding comparable figures of the busiest motorway sections in Croatia. Conversely, the lowest traffic volume on the D8 road is observed near Karlobag due to comparatively less developed tourism and the absence of major cities in the area. The AADT recorded on the D8 road observed in Split (Solin and Stobreč) is nearly 50 times greater than in Karlobag.

Note: All the traffic counting sites are located along the D8 road.

Major intersections

Listed settlements contain additional intersections with local and/or non-categorized roads.The intersections are at-grade except where otherwise noted.
{| class="wikitable" 
|- 
!scope="col"|County
!scope="col"|km
!scope="col"|Location
!scope="col"|Junction
!scope="col"|Notes
|-
| rowspan=39|Primorje-Gorski Kotar
| bgcolor=ddffdd|0
| bgcolor=ddffdd|Pasjak border crossing
| bgcolor=ddffdd| G7
| bgcolor=ddffdd|Pasjak border crossing to Slovenia.Northern terminus of the road and of the European route E61; Northbound D8 traffic defaults to Slovenian G7 road
|-
| 3
| Pasjak
|
|
|-
| 5
| Šapjane
|
|
|-
| 6
| 
| nowrap=yes|
| Connection to Rupa, Škalnica and Saršoni
|-
| bgcolor=ddffdd|6
| bgcolor=ddffdd|Rupa interchange
| bgcolor=ddffdd nowrap=yes|
| bgcolor=ddffdd|Connection to A7 motorway Rupa interchange and to Rupa border crossing to Slovenia; The D8 and the E61 north of the interchange are concurrent; A parclo interchange
|-
| rowspan=2| 15
| rowspan=2| Permani
| 
| To Vodice and Jelovice border crossing to Slovenia
|-
| 
| To Breza
|-
| 16
| Mučići
|
|
|-
| 16–18
| Jurdani
| 
| Connection (via a short connector) to the A7 motorway (E61) in Jurdani interchange (executed as a trumpet interchange)
|-
| 19
| Jušići
| 
| To Spinčići and Kastav
|-
| rowspan=3|20–23
| rowspan=3|Matulji
| 
| Connection to the A8 motorway (E751) in Opatija junction (executed as an at-grade intersection)
|-
| 
| To Opatija and Lovran
|-
| 
| To Opatija
|-
| rowspan=6 nowrap=yes|23–37
| rowspan=6|Rijeka
| 
| To Kastav and the A7 motorway Diračje interchange (E61) 
|-
| 
| To the Port of Rijeka (west) and the A7 motorway in Škurinje interchange (E61)
|-
| 
| To Karlovac and the A6 motorway in Čavle interchange (E65)
|-
| 
| To the Port of Rijeka (Brajdica Terminal) and the A7 motorway in Draga interchange (E65)
|-
| 
| To the Orehovica interchange. The interchange allows A6 and A7 traffic to exit to the Ž5054, but it does not permit access to the interchange from the county road.
|-
| 
| Connecting areas within the city of Rijeka itself only
|-
| 38–40
| Kostrena
|
|
|-
| bgcolor=ddffdd|44
| bgcolor=ddffdd|
| bgcolor=ddffdd|
| bgcolor=ddffdd|To the A7 motorway Sveti Kuzam interchange (E65), the A6 motorway Čavle interchange (E65) and Kukuljanovo industrial zone and Bakar; The northern terminus of the D8/E65 concurrency
|-
| 47
| 
| 
| To Bakar and Meja
|-
| 51
| Bakarac
|
|
|-
| 53–54
| Kraljevica
|
|
|-
| 55
| 
| 
| To Kraljevica
|-
| 55
| 
| 
| To Krk and Cres (via the D102 and the A6 motorway Oštrovica interchange (E65) (via the D523); A diamond interchange
|-
| 59
| 
| 
| To the A6 motorway Oštrovica interchange (E65)
|-
| 60
| 
| 
| To Jadranovo (the Ž5088 loops between the D8 and Jadranovo and they form two intersections)
|-
| 61
| 
| 
| To Jadranovo
|-
| 65
| 
| 
| To Dramalj
|-
| 66–69
| Crikvenica
| 
| The Ž5091 connects parts of Crikvenica only
|-
| 70–72
| Selce
| 
| The Ž5092 connects parts of Selce only
|-
| 72
| 
| 
| To Jargovo, Bribir, Lukovo and Fužine
|-
| rowspan=2|76–79
| rowspan=2|Novi Vinodolski
| 
| To Bribir, Drvenik and Križišće 
|-
| 
| To Bater and Breze
|-
| 81
| Povile
|
|
|-
| 85
| Klenovica
| 
| The Ž5109 connects to further parts of Klenovica only
|-
| 86
| 
| 
| To Krivi Put and Prokike
|-
| 93
| Sibinj
|
|
|-
| rowspan=10|Lika-Senj
| bgcolor=ddffdd nowrap=yes|98–101
| bgcolor=ddffdd|Senj
| bgcolor=ddffdd|
| bgcolor=ddffdd|To the A1 motorway in Žuta Lokva interchange and to Josipdol; The D8 and the E65 are concurrent north of the intersection, where the E65 switches between the D8 (north of Senj) and the D23
|-
| 106
| Kalic
|
|
|-
| 109
| Sveti Juraj
| 
| To Krasno Polje, Velika Plana, Smiljan and Gospić
|-
| 136
|
| 
| To Jablanac and ferry connection to Mišnjak, Rab (D105)
|-
| 149
|
| 
| To Prizna and ferry connection to Žigljen, Pag (D106)
|-
| 156
| Cesarica
|
|
|-
| 158
| Ribarica
|
|
|-
| 162
| Karlobag
| 
| To Gospić
|-
| 181
| Lukovo Šugarje
|
|
|-
| 191
| Barić Draga
|
|
|-
| rowspan=31|Zadar
| 198
| Tribanj Krušćica
|
|
|-
| 200
| Tribanj Šibuljina
|
|
|-
| nowrap=yes|209–211
| Starigrad
| 
| To Paklenica National Park
|-
| 214
| Seline
|
|
|-
| 220
| Modric
|
|
|-
| 222
| Rovanjska
|
|
|-
| 224
| Maslenica interchange
| 
| Connection to the A1 motorway Maslenica interchange (E65) via a short connector; The Maslenica interchange is executed as a trumpet
|-
| 225
| 
| 
| To Maslenica and Zaton Obrovački
|-
| 226
| align=center colspan=3|Maslenica Bridge
|-
| 231
| Posedarje
|
|
|-
| 232
| 
| 
| To Pag and the A1 motorway Posedarje interchange (E65)
|-
| 235
| 
| 
| To Islam Latinski
|-
| 236
| Zadar 1 interchange
| 
| To the A1 motorway Zadar 1 interchange (E65), reached via a short connector; The interchange is executed as a trumpet
|-
| 240
| Poličnik
|
|
|-
| 246
| Murvica
|
|
|-
| 250
| 
| 
| To Crno and Babindub
|-
| rowspan=6|251–256
| rowspan=6|Zadar
| 
| To Nin and Vir
|-
| 
| To Zadar ferry port – ferry access to Preko, Ugljan Island (D110), Brbinj and Sali, Dugi otok (D109), Mali Lošinj (D100) as well as to Iž, Rava, Molat, Sestrunj, Zverinac, Ist, Silba, Olib and Premuda
|-
| 
| To Port of Zadar, Gaženica, Zadar Airport and the A1 motorway Zadar 2 interchange
|-
| 
| To the Babindub interchange of the D424 expressway (via Benkovačka Street)
|-
| 
| Connection to the Ž6036 road
|-
| 
| The Ž6038 connects to areas of the city of Zadar only
|-
| 257–259
| Bibinje
|
|
|-
| 262
| Sukošan
| 
| To the Tromilja interchange of the D424 expressway
|-
| 269
| Sveti Petar na moru
| 
| To Donje Raštane
|-
| 274
| Turanj
|
|
|-
| 275
| Sveti Filip i Jakov
| 
| To Sikovo
|-
| 278
| Biograd na moru
| 
| To Biograd ferry port, Benkovac and the A1 motorway Benkovac interchange (E65); Hybrid parclo interchange
|-
| 281
| 
| 
| To Crvena Luka ferry port
|-
| 284–285
| Pakoštane
|
|
|-
| 288
| Drage
|
|
|-
| rowspan=20|Šibenik-Knin
| 300–302
| Pirovac
| 
| To Kašić Banjevački and Stankovci
|-
| 304
| 
| 
| To Knin (via the D59) and to Tisno and Murter (via the D121)
|-
| 307
| 
| 
| To Tribunj
|-
| 312–313
| Vodice
| 
| To Srima; The Ž6087 loops from Vodice to Srima and back to the D8
|-
| rowspan=2|316
| rowspan=2|
| 
| To Srima
|-
| nowrap=yes|
| To Jadrija; Trumpet interchange
|-
| rowspan=3|318
| rowspan=2|
| 
| To Benkovac
|-
| 
| To Zaton
|-
| colspan=3 align=center|Šibenik Bridge
|-
| rowspan=3|321–329
| rowspan=3|Šibenik
| 
| To Šibenik ferry port, Drniš and Knin; Parclo interchange
|-
| 
| To the A1 motorway Šibenik interchange (E65); Trumpet interchange
|-
| 
| To Port of Šibenik and Boraja; Parclo interchange
|-
| 329
| 
| 
| To Solaris resort; Modified trumpet interchange
|-
| 330–333
| Brodarica
| 
| 
|-
| 335
| Žaborić
| 
| To Jadrtovac
|-
| 340
| Grabeštica
| 
| To Sapina Doca
|-
| 351–352
| Primošten
| 
| 
|-
| 358
| 
| 
| To Rogoznica
|-
| 363
| 
| 
| To Dvornica
|-
| 366
| Svinca
| 
| 
|-
| rowspan=43|Split-Dalmatia
| rowspan=2|370–372
| rowspan=2|Marina
| 
| To Gustirna, Mitlo and Blizna Donja
|-
| 
| To Vinišće
|-
| 374
| Poljica
| 
| To Vrsine
|-
| rowspan=3|378–382
| rowspan=3|Seget
| bgcolor=ffdddd|
| bgcolor=ffdddd|To Boraja; Diamond interchange, accessible to northbound D8 traffic and traffic joining southbound D8 only 
|-
| 
| To Sorići and Seget Donji
|-
| 
| To Trogir
|-
| rowspan=2|382–385
| rowspan=2|Trogir
| 
| To the D315 road
|-
| 
| To the D126 road
|-
| 387
| 
| 
| To Trogir and Split Airport (via the D315) and to Plano via the Ž6091
|-
| 391
| Kaštela
|
|
|-
| bgcolor=ffdddd|403
| bgcolor=ffdddd|
| bgcolor=ffdddd|
| bgcolor=ffdddd|To Kaštela; Partial diamond interchange, accessible to northbound D8 traffic and traffic joining southbound D8 only 
|-
| 404
| 
| 
| To Split (via the Ž6139 and Solinska Street) and to Solin and Klis (via the Ž6253)
|-
| rowspan=4|405–410
| rowspan=4|Split
| 
| To A1 motorway Dugopolje interchange (E65); A roundabout interchange with the D8 as the primary road
|-
| 
| To Split to the Port of Split – Jadrolinija ferry access to Supetar, Bol and Milna on Brač Island, Stari Grad and Jelsa on Hvar Island, Rogač on Šolta Island, as well as to Vis and Lastovo islands. A partial diamond interchange
|-
| 
| The Ž6140 connects the D8 to parts of the city of Split only
|-
| 
| To Kamen
|-
| rowspan=2|411
| rowspan=2|Stobreč
| 
| To Žrnovnica and Tugare
|-
| 
| To TTTS business zone
|-
| 414
| Podstrana
| 
| The Ž6162 connects the D8 to parts of Podstrana only
|-
| 422
| Jesenice
|
|
|-
| 423
| Dugi Rat
|
|
|-
| 426
| Duće
|
|
|-
| rowspan=2|427–430
| rowspan=2|Omiš
| 
| To A1 motorway Blato na Cetini interchange and Gata (E65)
|-
| 
| To Kučiće, Slime and the D39 state road
|-
| 433
| Stanići
|
|
|-
| 434
| Čelina
|
|
|-
| 437
| 
| 
| To Lokva
|-
| 443
| Marušići
| 
| To Mimice and Lokva
|-
| 448
| 
| 
| To A1 motorway Šestanovac interchange (E65) and Aržano
|-
| 452
| 
| 
| To Brela
|-
| 454–456
| Baška Voda
| 
| To A1 motorway Zagvozd interchange (E65)
|-
| rowspan=4|463–467
| rowspan=4|Makarska
| 
| To Makarska ferry port
|-
| 
| To A1 motorway Ravča interchange (E65)
|-
| 
| To Veliko Brdo
|-
| 
| To connecting the D8 and the D411 via an alternate route running through Makarska
|-
| 470
| Tučepi
| 
| 
|-
| 473
| Podgora
| 
| To the D512 state road
|-
| 484
| Živogošće
| 
| 
|-
| 493
| Drvenik
| 
| To Drvenik ferry port
|-
| 497
| Zaostrog
| 
| 
|-
| 501
| Podaca
| 
| 
|-
| 503
| Brist
| 
| 
|-
| 505
| Gradac
| 
| 
|-
| rowspan=9|Dubrovnik-Neretva
| rowspan=3|516–519
| rowspan=3|Ploče
| 
| To Port of Ploče
|-
| bgcolor=ddffdd|
| bgcolor=ddffdd|To A1 motorway Ploče interchange and onwards to Bosnia and Herzegovina via the D62 and Mali Prolog border crossing or via the A10 and Metković border crossing; The D8 and the D65 are concurrent south of the intersection
|-
| 
| To the D413 state road
|-
| 520
| Čeveljuša interchange
| 
| Expressway to the D513 state road; As of September 2011, the route is incomplete and planned to connect Ploče to the A1 motorway Ploče interchange; Connection to the D513 is provisional; A trumpet interchange
|-
| 522
| 
| 
| To Rogotin and Komin
|-
| 523
| colspan=3 align=center|Neretva Bridge
|-
| 543
| Duboka
| 
| Area adjacent to Duboka (to the west) is site of the north abutment of the Pelješac Bridge 
|-
| 546
| Klek
| 
| 
|-
| 548
| Klek border crossing
| 
| The road extends south of the border crossing 
|-
| colspan=5 align=center| section of Adriatic Highway through Neum corridor in Bosnia and Herzegovina
|-
| rowspan=28|Dubrovnik-Neretva
| 549
| Zaton Doli border crossing
| 
| 
|-
| 554
| 
| 
| To Sveti Nikola
|-
| 560
| 
| 
| To Ston and Orebić ferry port
|-
| 564
| Doli
| 
| 
|-
| 575–576
| Slano
| 
| 
|-
| 590
| Trsteno
| 
| To Slano and Rudine
|-
| 593
| Orašac
| 
| 
|-
| 596–600
| Zaton
| 
| 
|-
| 602–603
| Lozica
| 
| To Mokošica, Komolac, and Sustjepan (D420)
|-
| 604
| colspan=3 align=center|Franjo Tuđman Bridge
|-
| bgcolor=ddffdd|604–608
| bgcolor=ddffdd|Dubrovnik
| bgcolor=ddffdd|
| bgcolor=ddffdd|To Gruž (Port of Dubrovnik) and Sustjepan; The D8 and the European route E80 are concurrent south of the intersection
|-
| 612
| 
| 
| To Gornji Brgat and Gornji Brgat border crossing to Bosnia and Herzegovina
|-
| 613
| Čibača
| 
| 
|-
| 615
| Kupari
| 
| 
|-
| 616
| Župa Dubrovačka
| 
| To Petrača, Grbavac and Brgat
|-
| 617
| Mlini
| 
| 
|-
| 618
| Zavrelje
| 
| 
|-
| 619
| Soline
| 
| 
|-
| 620
| Plat
| 
| 
|-
| rowspan=3|623
| rowspan=3|Zvekovica
| 
| To Cavtat
|-
| 
| To Drvenik
|-
| 
| To Vučje Ždrijelo
|-
| 627
| Dubrovnik Airport
| 
| Dubrovnik Airport is directly accessed by the D8
|-
| 629
| Čilipi
| 
| 
|-
| 636
| 
| 
| To Radovčići
|-
| 637–638
| Gruda
| 
| To Dubravka
|-
| 640
| Karasovići
| 
| To Vitaljina and Konfin border crossing to Montenegro
|-
| bgcolor=ddffdd|643
| bgcolor=ddffdd|Karasovići border crossing
| bgcolor=ddffdd|
| bgcolor=ddffdd|Border crossing to Montenegro; The southern terminus of the route, extending as Montenegrin route M-1 and the southern terminus of the D8 and European routes E65 and E80

See also
 Adriatic Highway

Maps

Sources

D008
D008
D008
D008
D008
D008
D008